Salt White is a 2011 Georgian drama film directed by Keti Machavariani.

Cast
 Nino Koridze
 Gagi Svanidze
 Fea Tsivadze

References

External links
 

2011 films
2011 drama films
2010s Georgian-language films
2011 directorial debut films
Drama films from Georgia (country)